Poecilotheria subfusca,  or the ivory ornamental, is a spider in the tarantula family, Theraphosidae. It is endemic to Sri Lanka. , the World Spider Catalog regarded Poecilotheria bara as a synonym. Other sources, particularly in the pet trade, have treated highland and lowland forms as distinct species, with the lowland forms being P. bara.

Description
The female is larger than the male, having a body length of 8–9 cm. Males are 6–7 cm. The species can distinguished from others in the genus due to its large black opisthosoma and the folium having three linked dark spots, that end halfway down the opisthosoma.

The female has a carapace that dorsally is dark brown with pale edges and has a starburst appearance. The chelicerae are creamy colored. All four leg pairs are identical. The femur is blackish brown with a cream band, the patella is creamy and the tibia have two parallel lines of oblong spots. Ventrally the body is pale brownish with much darker maxillae. 

Dorsally, the male is pale brown all over the body with inconspicuous markings. Ventrally, it is similar to the female. All leg pairs are metallic brown in color.

Behaviour
Compared to other Poecilotheria species, this species is very agile and jumpy and can bite when provoked.

The spider has been observed to have a possibly mutualistic relationship with frogs such as Ramanella nagaoi, sharing tree holes of which some were observed to contain eggs and/or juveniles from the spider, frog, or both. As observed between frog Chiasmocleis ventrimaculata and tarantula Xenesthis immanis, the spider may protect the frog from predators while the frog protects the spider's eggs from ants.

References

subfusca
Spiders of Asia
Endemic fauna of Sri Lanka
Spiders described in 1917